Gustaw Gwozdecki (May 5, 1880 in Warsaw – March 3, 1935 in Paris) was a Polish painter, sculptor, printmaker, and a representative of Post-Impressionist Kapists.

Biography
He was the son of Florentyn, a journalist and vice-director of the Warsaw Theatre Directorate. In 1899, he began his artistic studies in Munich where he was accompanied privately by Stanisław Grocholski and Anton Ažbe. There he debuted at the Kunstverein, where he exhibited his artwork. In 1900, he went to Kraków where he studied at the Jan Matejko Academy of Fine Arts, where he was taught by Jan Stanisławski, and since 1901, in Warsaw where he was taught by Konrad Krzyżanowski. In 1902, he received his scholarship at the Society of the Incentive for Fine Arts (Towarzystwo Zachęty Sztuk Pięknych) and he went to the Parisian National School of Fine Arts, where he was taught sculpture by Hubert Ponscarm. From that point forward, he spent most of his years in Paris, and in 1904, he exhibited his artwork at the Salon d'Automne - from which Gustaw Gwozdecki became part of the Salon des indépendants. He regularly took part in exhibitions in Warsaw, Poznań, and Vienna.

In 1914, he co-lead the Polish Academy of Fine Arts (Polska Akademia Malarstwa) in Paris. From 1916, he had travelled extensively, and from 1917 to 1927 he permanently stayed in New York City, where he was the leader of Annual Salons. During his time in the United States of America he grew interest in the Polish communities. He advocated Polish fine arts in the United States of America and in France, and was a member of the Society of Polish Artists "Sztuka" (Stowarzyszenie Artystów Polskich "Sztuka") and the Society of Polish Artists "Rytm" (Stowarzyszenie Artystów Polskich "Rytm") where he had exhibited his artwork. He died vehemently in his workplace at the age of fifty four years.

He painted landscapes, portraits, caryatids and still life. He made sculptures out of marble and gypsum. His artwork contains simple figures, with repleted rich tones. Many of his artwork is based around the life of native people. His primary artwork made him one of Poland's first modernists and expressionists. After 1910, he moved to Fauvism, by which his artwork gained positive views from French fine arts critics. His artwork was promoted by his friend, Guillaume Apollinaire, which were part of the journal "La Plume". Currently, Gustaw Gwozdecki's artwork is located in various locations, which include: National Museum in Warsaw, Poznań, and Kraków, other international places include: the Society of Polish History and Literature (Towarzystwo Historyczno-Literackie) in Paris; the Gallery of Fine Arts nearby the Yale University; and the New York City based Kosciuszko Foundation in the United States of America. The rest of the artworks are located in private ownership in France and the United States of America.

Selected paintings

References

External links

1880 births
1935 deaths
19th-century Polish painters
19th-century Polish male artists
20th-century Polish painters
20th-century Polish male artists
Polish expatriates in the United States
Polish expatriates in France
Polish male painters